Qaleh Hamud (also Romanized as Qal‘eh Ḩamūd and Qal‘eh-ye Hamūd; also known as Kūt-e Ḩamīd, Kūt Hamud, Qal‘eh Ḩamīd, and Qal‘eh-ye Ḩamīd) is a village in Jayezan Rural District, Jayezan District, Omidiyeh County, Khuzestan Province, Iran. At the 2006 census, its population was 1,016, in 235 families.

References 

Populated places in Omidiyeh County